Osmar Ferreira Júnior (born 21 March 1987 in São Gonçalo, Rio de Janeiro) is a Brazilian footballer

Biography
Osmar started his career at Fluminense. In mid-2007 he left for Croatian club Dinamo Zagreb but in February 2008 returned to América (RJ). In June 2008 he was signed by Série C club Macaé, which he scored 3 goals (1 goal and a brace) for the team at the first stage. Osmar signed on 2 January 2011 for Operário Ferroviário Esporte Clube.

Notes

External links
 

Brazilian footballers
Fluminense FC players
GNK Dinamo Zagreb players
NK Inter Zaprešić players
America Football Club (RJ) players
Macaé Esporte Futebol Clube players
Brazilian expatriate footballers
Expatriate footballers in Croatia
Brazilian expatriate sportspeople in Croatia
Association football forwards
People from São Gonçalo, Rio de Janeiro
1987 births
Living people
Sportspeople from Rio de Janeiro (state)